Remo Girone (born 1948 in Asmara, Eritrea) is an Italian film and stage actor. He is best known for the role of Tano Cariddi in the epic TV mini-series La piovra (The Octopus). He appeared as an Italian-American mob boss in Live by Night and appeared in Ford vs Ferrari as Enzo Ferrari.

Filmography

External links 
 

1948 births
Living people
People from Asmara
Italian male television actors
Accademia Nazionale di Arte Drammatica Silvio D'Amico alumni
Eritrean emigrants to Italy
Italian male stage actors
20th-century Italian male actors
Eritrean people of Italian descent